Patna School of Painting (also Patna Qalaam, or Patna Kalam) is a style of Indian painting which existed in Bihar, India in the 18th and 19th centuries. Patna Qalaam was the world's first independent school of painting which dealt exclusively with the commoner and their lifestyle which also helped Patna Kalam paintings gain in popularity. The Principal centers were Patna, Danapur and Arrah.

Origin 
Patna Kalam is an off-shoot of Mughal painting. The Mughal style of painting matured in the regime of Jahangir, and his period was considered the golden era of Mughal paintings, but during the rule of Aurangzeb in the late 17th and early 18th century, artisans faced mass prosecution and aversion in art and painting. The painters migrated from Delhi looking for shelter in different places. One such group moved eastward and landed in  Murshidabad under the patronage of the Nawab of Bengal and other local aristocrats, though British patrons were also important. 

In the mid-18th century, after the fall of The Nawab of Bengal and the subsequent decline of Murshidabad, the artisans started moving to the next biggest city in the east, Patna. In Patna they came under the patronage of local aristocracy and often Indophile scions of the early East India Company.

Style 
Patna Kalam is regarded as an off-shoot of Mughal painting, with influences from Persian and the Company painting style developed for British customers. The portraits can be clearly seen having colours and linings from Mughal style, and the shading can be seen to be adopted from the British style. Diverging from the Mughal and Persian style of wide and exquisitely decorated borders, Patna Kalam primarily focused on the subject of the painting.

Unlike Mughal paintings, which focused on royalty and court scenes, flag bearers of Patna Kalam were deeply influenced by the daily life of the common man, also a common subject in Company painting. Their main subjects were local festivals, ceremonies, bazaar scenes, local rulers, and domestic activities. The paintings were done on diverse surfaces such as paper, mica, and even ivory diskettes, that were used as brooches.

A distinguishing characteristic of Patna Kalam is the lack of any landscape, foreground or background. Another characteristic was the development of the shading of solid forms. Patna Kalam paintings are painted straightway with the brush without marking with a pencil to delineate the contours of the picture and the procedure of painting is popularly known as 'Kajli Seahi.'

Patna Kalam Today 
Some well-known painters of Patna Kalam were Sewak Ram, Hulas Lall, Shiv Lal, Shiva Dayal, Mahadeo Lal, and Ishwari Prasad Verma. There is currently no one to carry on the tradition. Only three collections of Patna Kalam paintings exist in Bihar, one at the Patna Museum and others at Khuda Baksh Library, Patna, and Patna University’s College of Arts and Crafts. The Patna Kalam flourished only as long as its Western patrons existed.

Gallery

References

Further reading
 (see index: p. 148-152)

Schools of Indian painting
Culture of Bihar
Patna